A security detail, often known as a PSD (protective services detail, personal security detachment, personal security detail) or PPD (personal protection detail), is a protective team assigned to protect the personal security of an individual or group. PSDs can be made up of multiple federal and state government organisations, military personnel, law enforcement agents and/or private security contractors or private military contractors.

U.S. Marine Corps
In the U.S. Marine Corps, an individual's security team is called a "personal security detachment" and is assigned to the Personal Security Company.

Private security
PSD teams are often made up of private security personnel. Organizations such as Academi, DynCorp and Triple Canopy, Inc. and their internal and external security departments offer armed security teams to clients traveling to war zones and areas deemed dangerous by the State Department.

See also
 Executive protection
 Close protection specialist

References

External links
 Human Rights First; Private Security Contractors at War: Ending the Culture of Impunity (2008)

Bodyguards
Protective security units